WKOK (1070 AM) is a commercial radio station licensed to serve Sunbury, Pennsylvania. The station is owned by Sunbury Broadcasting Corporation and broadcasts a combination news/talk and sports radio format. Its directional broadcast tower array is located near Shikellamy State Park.

1070 AM is a United States and Canadian clear-channel frequency.

The news/talk format is broadcast during the daytime, during which it is affiliated with CBS News Radio. The station switches to a sports radio format at night and for most of the weekend, carrying Fox Sports Radio programming. Accuweather forecasts on WKOK are distributed by United Stations Radio Networks. Despite its "Newsradio" branding, the station airs several talk radio programs in the daytime including the locally produced On the Mark and WKOK Sunrise programs, as well as several syndicated programs including The Dan Patrick Show, The Dave Ramsey Show, The Steve Jones Show and The Kim Komando Show.

The station broadcasts Penn State football and basketball games, as well as Shikellamy High School wrestling and basketball games.

History
The Federal Radio Commission granted Bucknell University in Lewisburg, Pennsylvania a license for the station on November 6, 1925 (per FCC History Cards) with the WJBU call sign. Originally assigned to 1420 kHz with 100 watts, the station was reassigned to 1400 kHz on September 3, 1927 followed by another reassignment to 1210 kHz on December 28, 1928.

On May 12, 1933, the station's license was voluntarily reassigned to Charles S. Blue. The station was moved to Sunbury, Pennsylvania that same day. Following the move, the station's call sign was changed to WKOK on July 27, 1933. The station's license was then voluntarily reassigned to Sunbury Broadcasting Corporation on April 13, 1934. WKOK occasionally shared its frequency with WBAX from October 27, 1936, until June 7, 1939.

The Federal Communications Commission (FCC) granted Sunbury Broadcasting a new license for the station on October 1, 1940, with a power increase to 250 watts. WKOK was reassigned from 1210 kHz to 1240 kHz on March 29, 1941. On that day, 795 US radio stations changed frequency as the result of the North American Regional Broadcasting Agreement in Havana with representatives from Canada, US, Mexico, Cuba, Haiti, and the Dominican Republic.

On October 25, 1961 the FCC granted Sunbury Broadcasting a construction permit for the station to change the station's frequency to 1070 kHz, with a power increase to 10,000 watts daytime, 1,000 watts nighttime using directional antennas with different directional patterns for both day and night ("DA-2"). The FCC granted a new license with these changes effective October 1, 1963. The FCC subsequently granted permission on June 10, 1970 for the station to switch to a non-directional antenna during daytime hours while continuing to use a directional antenna at night ("DA-N"). The station's day and night powers were not changed. The FCC granted a new license with these facilities on November 10, 1970.

References

External links
 Official website

KOK
CBS Sports Radio stations
Fox Sports Radio stations